Yanajaja (possibly from Quechua yana black, qaqa rock, "black rock") may refer to:

 Yanajaja, a mountain in Cusco Region, Peru
 Yanajaja (Arequipa), a mountain in Arequipa Region, Peru